This is a list of Akron Zips football players in the NFL Draft.

Key

Selections

References

Akron

Akron Zips NFL Draft